Boothroyd may refer to a number of things:

People
 Aidy Boothroyd, English former footballer and the manager of the England national under-21 football team
 Allen Boothroyd (1943–2020), industrial designer
 Basil Boothroyd, English humourist
 Benjamin Boothroyd, English clergyman and Hebrew scholar
 Betty Boothroyd (1929–2023), British politician who was the first female Speaker of the House of Commons
 Clement G. Boothroyd, World War I flying ace
 Geoffrey Boothroyd, English firearms expert and author of several works on the subject
 Giles Boothroyd (born 1969), rugby league footballer of the 1980s and 1990s
 Richard Boothroyd, English cricketer

Fictional characters
 Q (James Bond), the quartermaster in the James Bond books and movies, is named Boothroyd, though he is more often referred to by his job title, "Q".

Places
 Boothroyd, West Yorkshire, a village in the Metropolitan Borough of Kirklees, England.
Boothroyd, British Columbia
 Boothroyd First Nation, a First Nations band government in British Columbia, Canada.
 The Hartung-Boothroyd Observatory, located near Cornell University in Ithaca, New York, USA.